Mohamed Ben Salem, born on 19 February 1953, is a Tunisian politician. He served from December 2011 to January 2014 as Minister of Agriculture under the Prime Ministers Hamadi Jebali and Ali Laarayedh.

Political activism

He is a member of the Ennahda Movement. In 1987, he was jailed for nine months, and two and a half months between the years 1990 and 1991. He lived in exile in France from 1991 to 2011. During that time, he was involved with the Paris-based Tunisian Solidarity Association.

Minister

On 20 December 2011, after former President Zine El Abidine Ben Ali was deposed, he joined the Jebali Cabinet as Minister of Agriculture. He remained in office in the Laarayedh Cabinet.

Career
Associate Manager of a CIVIL SOCIETY ESTATE "AL BARAKA" having a capital of 282,030.68 EURO

References

Living people
1953 births
Tunisian Muslims
Government ministers of Tunisia
Ennahda politicians
Members of the Constituent Assembly of Tunisia
Members of the Assembly of the Representatives of the People